The Patent Office Professional Association (POPA) is a professional union of United States patent examiners. It was formed in 1964. "Professional Representation for Patent Professionals."

POPA represents all patent office professionals at the US Patent and Trademark Office including:

 Patent Attorneys at the Board of Patent Appeals and Interferences (BPAI)
 Non-supervisory attorneys and Congressional Affairs Specialists in the Office of External Affairs (OEA)
 Petitions attorneys in the Office of Petitions
 Review Quality Assurance Specialists (rQAS) in the Office of Patent Quality Assurance (OPQA)
 Designated Training Quality Assurance Specialists (tQAS)
 Non-supervisory patent examiners and primary examiners
 Non-supervisory Patent Reexamination Specialists in the Central Reexamination Unit (CRU)
 Patent Cooperation Treaty (PCT) examiners and attorney advisors
 Certain librarians and accountants

See also 

 United States Patent and Trademark Office (USPTO)

References

External links 
 Official web site
Trade unions established in 1964
Trade unions in the United States